Nowakia is an extinct genus of free living animals from Family Nowakiidae.

References 

 Le genre Nowakia (Dacryoconarides) dans le Praguien (Dévonien) de la République Tcheque: Biométrie, systématique, Phylogénie, Paléoenvironnements. S Gessa, 1996

External links 
 
 Nowakia at fossilworks

Tentaculita
Devonian animals
Devonian first appearances
Devonian extinctions